Chorizandra cymbaria, commonly known as heron bristle rush or heron bristle sedge, is a sedge of the family Cyperaceae that is native to Australia.

Description
The monoecious and rhizomatous perennial sedge has a dense tufted habit. The plant blooms between October and December producing purple flowers. They become yellow-green at maturity and are longitudinally striate.

Classification
The plant was first formally described by the botanist Robert Brown in 1810 as part of the work Prodromus Florae Novae Hollandiae. The name is often misapplies to Chorizandra australis.

Range
The species is found in damp areas in Western Australia, Victoria, Tasmania, coastal areas of New South Wales and Queensland.
In Western Australia it is found in peaty swamp areas along the coast of the South West and Great Southern regions where it grows in sandy-clay soils.

References

Plants described in 1810
Flora of Western Australia
Flora of Victoria (Australia)
cymbaria
Taxa named by Robert Brown (botanist, born 1773)